The Chagharzais or Chagarzais are a division of the Malizai clan of the Yousafzai tribe. Colonel Wylly, Harold Carmichael, 1858–1932, described these  people in the following words:

Origin

Chagharzais are the descendants of Chaghar or Chagar (Chagharzai), the son of Mali (Malizai) who was one of the sons of Yousaf (Yousafzai). They are divided into following sub-divisions:

Sections and sub-sections (Khels)

The three Chagarzai sub-divisions are further divided into following Sections and Sub-sections: 
{|border="1" cellspacing="2.0" cellpadding="4" width="80%"
|+
| bgcolor="#969696" |Sub Clan
| bgcolor="#969696" |Section
| bgcolor="#969696" |Sub-section  (Khel)
|-
|Chagharzai
|Ferozai
|(Not Known)
|-
| bgcolor="#C0C0C0" | 
|Basi Khel
|Daud Khel, Shahu Khel, Khwaja Khel, Kalandar Khel, Kasan Khel and Babujan Khel.
|-
| bgcolor="#C0C0C0" | 
|Nasrat Khel
|Hanju Khel, Haider Khel, Lukman Khel and Badha Khel
|-
|
|Bahlool khel 
|shah

Demographics

The Chagharzais occupy the country on either side of the Indus river. They are located on the western slopes of Tor Ghar (Black Mountain), to the north of the Akazais. The southern boundary of the Chagarzais is contiguous with that of the Akazais. It follows the spur of the Tor Ghar running from the Machai Sar (peak) to the Indus bank — the southern face of the spur belonging to the Akazais and the northern to the Chagarzais. On the west and north the Indus forms the boundary, while on the east the Chagarzais are bounded by the territory of the Deshiwals and of the Pariari Saiyids.

Culture and traditions

Chagharzais have maintained their cultural identity and individuality. They lead their lives strictly in accordance with code of ethics of Pashtunwali which comprises Manliness, Goodness, Gallantry, Loyalty and Modesty. Chagharzais maintain the Pashtun customs of Jirga (consultative assembly), Nanawati (delegation pleading guilty), Hujhra (large drawing room) and Melmasteya (hospitality).

Recent developments

On 28 January 2011, Tor Ghar became the 25th District of Khyber Pakhtoonkhwa. Judba is the Capital of this newly born district with tehsils of Judba, Kandar Hassanzai and Mada Khel. Most of the Chagharzai areas come under the Judba tehsil.

References 

Social groups of Pakistan
Yusufzai Pashtun tribes